The Pierce County Community Newspaper Group (PCCNG) consists of four newspapers in the Tacoma, Washington area. The papers include the Tacoma Weekly (formerly the Tacoma Monthly), the Fife Free Press, and the Milton-Edgewood Signal.

The Tacoma Monthly began in 1987 and became a weekly paper in 1994. It is distributed around Tacoma.

The Fife Free Press began in August 2003 and is published every other Thursday. It is distributed in Fife and is mailed to every business and residential address within the city limits.

The Milton-Edgewood Signal began in January 2004 and is published every other Thursday. It is distributed to Milton, Washington and Edgewood, Washington.

The publisher of the Pierce County Community Newspaper Group is John Weymer.
In a recent two-year period, publisher John Weymer paid $9,157.06 in wage theft claims that were filed against him at the Washington Department of Labor and Industries.

References

Newspapers published in Washington (state)
Companies based in Tacoma, Washington